The 1979 UCF Knights football team represented the University of Central Florida (UCF) as an independent during the 1979 NCAA Division III football season. This was first varsity football team fielded by UCF. The Knights were led by head coach Don Jonas and played their home games at the Florida Citrus Bowl Stadium, now known as Camping World Stadium in downtown Orlando.

UCF played its first football game on September 22, against . The Knights proved victorious with a 21–0 shutout, and less than a week later, the Knights won their first home game by defeating Fort Benning, 7–6. Jonas led the Knights to a 6–2 inaugural season, behind an average attendance of 11,240, including an NCAA Division III record crowd of 14,138 for the game against Fort Benning.

The humble beginnings for the Knights football team were exemplified during their inaugural season. The team had no locker room, the coaching staff was composed of volunteers, players were asked to bring their own cleats, and all equipment and supplies were donated. Practices took place on a driving range, and players had to go to a classroom building on campus to find showers. Jonas famously offered to take the head coaching position for no salary.

Schedule

References

UCF
UCF Knights football seasons
UCF Knights football